Michael Martyn (born 31 August 1968) is a former Australian rules footballer who played for North Melbourne and Carlton in the Australian Football League (AFL). He is the son of Bryan Martyn, who also played for North Melbourne, and is a relative of early Carlton champion Paddy O'Brien. He is an AFL life member.

After retiring from the AFL Mick played a season with Spotswood in the W.R.F.L.

Early life
Martyn was born with a cleft palate disorder which does not allow him to speak normally or fluently. He attended St. Paul's College in North Altona.

North Melbourne Football Club
Martyn was drafted to the Kangaroos under the father–son rule. He notched up his first league game against Geelong but did not come on until the third quarter, where he lined up on Gary Ablett, Sr. In 1995, he was awarded the Michael Tuck Medal after the Kangaroos beat the Adelaide Crows in the 1995 Ansett Cup. In 2002, he gained permission by the AFL to wear his father's number 30 jumper, as it would be the last match his father ever witnessed before dying a few days later. Mick said, "I didn't want to do it (wear Bryan's number) after he died. It was the greatest night of my life. It was better than winning a premiership. I wore two jumpers because I wanted to send one down with him, down the grave." Martyn won two premierships with the Kangaroos in 1996 and 1999 until he was delisted by the Kangaroos at the end of the 2002 season.

Bali bombings
Martyn was injured in the 2002 Bali bombings, where he received burns to the back of his scalp. He had been drinking with Jason McCartney at Paddy's bar at the time of the attack. After exiting the building, he and McCartney left the scene and were admitted to hospital, McCartney suffering more life-threatening injuries. Martyn caused some controversy in 2004, commenting on radio station Triple M that after the Bali bombings "it wasn't the blue and white in my corner; it was the navy blue".

Carlton Football Club
At the 2002 draft, with Denis Pagan needing a "gorilla" at full-back, Martyn was drafted by Carlton to play for the 2003 season. He played a handful of games to notch up his 300th match against Essendon in Round 18 2003 at the MCG, where Carlton lost by 34 points; after the match, he was chaired off the ground. However, that turned out to be his last match; he announced his retirement after the serious knee injury he suffered the next week at training.

Playing statistics

|- style="background-color: #EAEAEA"
! scope="row" style="text-align:center" | 1988
|style="text-align:center;"|
| 50 || 21 || 1 || 0 || 205 || 51 || 256 || 55 || 24 || 0.0 || 0.0 || 9.8 || 2.4 || 12.2 || 2.6 || 1.1
|-
! scope="row" style="text-align:center" | 1989
|style="text-align:center;"|
| 4 || 18 || 3 || 4 || 224 || 75 || 299 || 57 || 13 || 0.2 || 0.2 || 12.4 || 4.2 || 16.6 || 3.2 || 0.7
|- style="background:#eaeaea;"
! scope="row" style="text-align:center" | 1990
|style="text-align:center;"|
| 4 || 15 || 0 || 0 || 114 || 38 || 152 || 27 || 11 || 0.0 || 0.0 || 7.6 || 2.5 || 10.1 || 1.8 || 0.7
|-
! scope="row" style="text-align:center" | 1991
|style="text-align:center;"|
| 4 || 22 || 1 || 0 || 209 || 84 || 293 || 75 || 12 || 0.0 || 0.0 || 9.5 || 3.8 || 13.3 || 3.4 || 0.5
|- style="background:#eaeaea;"
! scope="row" style="text-align:center" | 1992
|style="text-align:center;"|
| 4 || 18 || 5 || 6 || 124 || 81 || 205 || 47 || 15 || 0.3 || 0.3 || 6.9 || 4.5 || 11.4 || 2.6 || 0.8
|-
! scope="row" style="text-align:center" | 1993
|style="text-align:center;"|
| 4 || 19 || 1 || 0 || 136 || 54 || 190 || 40 || 11 || 0.1 || 0.0 || 7.2 || 2.8 || 10.0 || 2.1 || 0.6
|- style="background:#eaeaea;"
! scope="row" style="text-align:center" | 1994
|style="text-align:center;"|
| 4 || 21 || 0 || 0 || 116 || 72 || 188 || 42 || 7 || 0.0 || 0.0 || 5.5 || 3.4 || 9.0 || 2.0 || 0.3
|-
! scope="row" style="text-align:center" | 1995
|style="text-align:center;"|
| 4 || 17 || 2 || 1 || 87 || 91 || 178 || 35 || 6 || 0.1 || 0.1 || 5.1 || 5.4 || 10.5 || 2.1 || 0.4
|- style="background:#eaeaea;"
! scope="row" style="text-align:center" | 1996
|style="text-align:center;"|
| 4 || 25 || 1 || 1 || 155 || 111 || 266 || 67 || 14 || 0.0 || 0.0 || 6.2 || 4.4 || 10.6 || 2.7 || 0.6
|-
! scope="row" style="text-align:center" | 1997
|style="text-align:center;"|
| 4 || 25 || 0 || 0 || 201 || 66 || 267 || 62 || 19 || 0.0 || 0.0 || 8.0 || 2.6 || 10.7 || 2.5 || 0.8
|- style="background:#eaeaea;"
! scope="row" style="text-align:center" | 1998
|style="text-align:center;"|
| 4 || 20 || 0 || 0 || 150 || 58 || 208 || 51 || 11 || 0.0 || 0.0 || 7.5 || 2.9 || 10.4 || 2.6 || 0.6
|-
! scope="row" style="text-align:center" | 1999
|style="text-align:center;"|
| 4 || 21 || 0 || 0 || 153 || 76 || 229 || 54 || 16 || 0.0 || 0.0 || 7.3 || 3.6 || 10.9 || 2.6 || 0.8
|- style="background:#eaeaea;"
! scope="row" style="text-align:center" | 2000
|style="text-align:center;"|
| 4 || 15 || 1 || 0 || 101 || 42 || 143 || 43 || 7 || 0.1 || 0.0 || 6.7 || 2.8 || 9.5 || 2.9 || 0.5
|-
! scope="row" style="text-align:center" | 2001
|style="text-align:center;"|
| 4 || 11 || 0 || 1 || 73 || 33 || 106 || 25 || 11 || 0.0 || 0.1 || 6.6 || 3.0 || 9.6 || 2.3 || 1.0
|- style="background:#eaeaea;"
! scope="row" style="text-align:center" | 2002
|style="text-align:center;"|
| 4/30 || 19 || 1 || 1 || 111 || 42 || 153 || 36 || 14 || 0.1 || 0.1 || 5.8 || 2.2 || 8.1 || 1.9 || 0.7
|-
! scope="row" style="text-align:center" | 2003
|style="text-align:center;"|
| 10 || 13 || 0 || 0 || 52 || 34 || 86 || 22 || 8 || 0.0 || 0.0 || 4.0 || 2.6 || 6.6 || 1.7 || 0.6
|- class="sortbottom"
! colspan=3| Career
! 300
! 16
! 14
! 2211
! 1008
! 3219
! 738
! 199
! 0.1
! 0.0
! 7.4
! 3.4
! 10.7
! 2.5
! 0.7
|}

References

External links
Mick Martyn's profile on kangaroos.com.au

1968 births
Living people
Australian rules footballers from Victoria (Australia)
North Melbourne Football Club players
North Melbourne Football Club Premiership players
Carlton Football Club players
Victorian State of Origin players
Syd Barker Medal winners
2002 Bali bombings
Two-time VFL/AFL Premiership players
People with speech impediment